Albert Ostman ( – 1975) was a Canadian prospector who reported that he was abducted by a Sasquatch and held captive for six days. He stated that the event took place near Toba Inlet, British Columbia in 1924.

The story
In 1924, Albert Ostman, a lumberjack and woodsman, went to the area for a vacation. Ostman had heard stories about the "man beasts" who supposedly roamed these woods but refused to believe them. As Ostman lay asleep one evening a Sasquatch purportedly picked him up and carried him off while he was in his sleeping bag. Ostman was carried in his sleeping bag across country for 3 hours by the Sasquatch. The Sasquatch dropped Ostman down on a plateau. Standing around him was a family of 4 of the creatures. Albert was kept captive by the Sasquatch. The captors were 2 adults and 2 children which held Ostman captive for six days. One of the Bigfoots was reported as being 8 feet tall. Ostman did not use his gun on them as they had done him no harm. He stayed with the Bigfoot family for a week. Ostman ate "sweet tasting grass" that they gave him. According to Ostman the female Sasquatch washed and stacked leaves. Albert escaped by making the large male Sasquatch groggy by feeding him some snuff. He did not tell his story for more than 24 years after it happened for fear of being thought of as crazy. As more Sasquatch stories appeared in the press Albert decided to tell his story to a local newspaper, The Province,  in 1957.

In 2007, the skeptic Joe Nickell characterized the story as "more likely the result of imagination than of recollection". Critics of Ostman note that he did not make the event public until 1957, thirty-three years after he said it took place. Primatologist John Napier states that "Ostman's story fails to convince me primarily on the grounds of the limited food resources available." Bigfoot researcher Peter Byrne cannot accept Ostman's story without more evidence.

References

1890s births
1975 deaths
Bigfoot
Canadian folklore
Canadian gold prospectors
Culture of British Columbia